Saruq Rural District is in Takht-e Soleyman District of Takab County, West Azerbaijan province, Iran. At the National Census of 2006, its population was 8,490 in 1,621 households. There were 8,113 inhabitants in 1,902 households at the following census of 2011. At the most recent census of 2016, the population of the rural district was 7,188 in 2,007 households. The largest of its 15 villages was Chowplu, with 1,788 people.

References 

Takab County

Rural Districts of West Azerbaijan Province

Populated places in West Azerbaijan Province

Populated places in Takab County